The Indian One Paisa coin is a former denomination of the Indian Rupee. The 1 coin equals  (one-hundredth) of the Indian Rupee. In 1955, India adopted metric system for coinage and amended the "Indian Coinage Act". Subsequently, one paisa coins were introduced on 1 April 1957. From 1957 to 1964, one paisa coin was called "Naya Paisa" (English: New Paisa) and on 1 June 1964, the term "Naya" was dropped and the denomination was simply called "One paisa". One paisa coin has been demonetized and is no longer legal tender.

History
Prior to 1957, Indian rupee was not decimalised and the rupee from 1835 to 1957 AD was further divided into 16 annas. Each anna was further divided to four Indian pices and each pice into three Indian pies till 1947 when the pie was demonetized. In 1955, India amended the "Indian Coinage Act" to adopt the metric system for coinage. Paisa coins were introduced in 1957, but from 1957 to 1964 the coin was called "Naya Paisa" (English: New Paisa). On 1 June 1964, the term "Naya" was dropped and the denomination was simply called "One paisa". One paisa coins were issued as a part of "The Decimal Series". One paisa coin was withdrawn from circulation and demonetized on 30 June 2011.

Variants

See also
 Indian paisa

References

Historical currencies of India
Coins of India
One-cent coins